Public humiliation or public shaming is a form of punishment whose main feature is dishonoring or disgracing a person, usually an offender or a prisoner, especially in a public place. It was regularly used as a form of judicially sanctioned punishment in previous centuries, and is still practiced by different means in the modern era.

In the United States, it was a common punishment from the beginning of European colonization through the 19th century. It fell out of common use in the 20th century, though it has seen a revival starting in the 1990s.

Shameful exposure 

Public humiliation exists in many forms. In general, a criminal sentenced to one of the many forms of this punishment could expect to be placed in a central, public, or open place so that his fellow citizens could easily witness the sentence and, occasionally, participate in it as a form of "mob justice".

Just like painful forms of corporal punishment, it has parallels in educational and other rather private punishments (but with some audience), in school or domestic disciplinary context, and as a rite of passage. Physical forms include being forced to wear some sign such as "donkey ears" (simulated in paper, as a sign one is—or at least behaved—proverbially stupid), wearing a dunce cap, having to stand, kneel or bend over in a corner, or repeatedly write something on a blackboard ("I will not spread rumors", for example). Here different levels of physical discomfort can be added, such as having to hold heavy objects, go barefoot (see below) or kneeling on an uneven surface. Like physical punishment and harsh hazing, these have become controversial in most modern societies, in many cases leading to legal restrictions and/or (sometimes voluntary) abolishment.

Head shaving can be a humiliating punishment prescribed in law, but also something done as "mob justice" - a stark example of which was the thousands of European women who had their heads shaved in front of cheering crowds in the wake of World War II, as punishment for associating with occupying Nazis during the war. Public shaving was applied to (true or alleged) collaborators after the Allied liberated occupied territories from the Nazi troops.

Forcing people to go barefoot has been used as a relatively effortless and more subtle form of humiliation in most past and present civilized cultures, primarily using the visual contrast to the standard form of appearance while also creating some level of physical discomfort. The exposure of bare feet often served as an indicator for imprisonment and slavery throughout ancient as well as modern history. Even today prisoners officially have to go barefoot in many countries of the world and are also presented in court and showcased to the public unshod. As shoes are commonly worn by all social classes since antiquity in most civilized societies, showcasing a captive to the public in bare feet traditionally symbolizes the person's loss of social standing and personal autonomy. It usually also causes a considerable degree of humiliation, as this noticeable detail typically sets the prisoner apart from spectators visually and demonstrates the person's vulnerability and general powerlessness.

Further means of public humiliation and degradation consist in forcing people to wear typifying clothes, which can be penitential garb or prison uniforms.

Presenting arrestees or prisoners to the public in restraints (such as handcuffs, shackles or similar devices) also serves as a convenient method of public humiliation besides the primary security aspects. The effect is complemented by presenting the person in a prison uniform or similar clothing.

Corporal punishment 

Apart from specific methods essentially aiming at humiliation, several methods combine pain and humiliation or even death and humiliation. In some cases, the pain—or at least discomfort—is insignificant or rather secondary to the humiliation.

Public punishment 
The simplest is to administer painful corporal punishment in public - the major aim may be deterrence of potential offenders - so the public will witness the perpetrator's fear and agony. This can either take place in a town square or other public gathering location such as a school, or take the form of a procession through the streets. This was not uncommon in the sentences to Staupenschlag (flagellation by whipping or birching, generally on the bare buttocks) in various German-speaking states, till the 19th century. A naval equivalent was Flogging round the fleet on a raft taken from ship to ship for consecutive installments of a great total of lashes, that could even be lethal. In some countries, the punishment of foot whipping is executed in public to this day.

 The humiliation, as well as degradation, is generally intensified if the perpetrator is unclothed (partially or entirely) as the exposure leaves the person feeling vulnerable and helpless. A common and simple form of humiliating exposure consists of taking away a person's shoes and keeping the prisoner barefoot during corporal punishment or generally.
 Further means of intensifying the public humiliation and degradation especially during punishment consist in forcing people to wear typifying clothes, which can be prison uniforms or in former times penitential garbs or rags, further incremented in combination with an exposure aspect such as bare feet.
 Even when not strictly public, humiliation can still be a psychologically "painful" aspect of punishment because of the presence of witnessing peers (such as fellow prisoners), staff, or other onlookers, or simply because the person administering the punishment is witnessing the reactions of the culprit. The loss of self-control in the presence of bystanders further increments the humiliating effect of the punishment significantly. This is also true for punishments in class and similar situations.

Torture marks 

The humiliation can be extended; intentionally or not; by leaving visible marks, such as scars, notably on body parts that are normally left visible. This also serves as a virtually indelible criminal record. This can even be the main intention of the punishment, as in the case of scarifications, such as human branding. It invariably is essential in forms of mutilation, such as ear cropping, though the functional loss is even greater; pain may even be intentionally minimized as in the case of surgical amputation, eliminating the risk of accidental death. Tarring and feathering also serves as means of extended humiliation.

Psychological effects 

Public shaming can result in negative psychological effects and devastating consequences, regardless of the punishment being justifiable or not. It could cause depression, suicidal thoughts and other severe mental problems. The humiliated individuals may develop a variety of symptoms including apathy, paranoia, anxiety, PTSD, or others. The rage and fury may arise in the persecuted individual, themselves lashing out against innocent victims, as they seek revenge or as a means of release.

Historical examples
 Crucifixion was used by the Romans to add public humiliation to a death penalty. Josephus describes how the Roman soldiers would crucify people naked, and using different tortuous positions as a way to further humiliate them. Crucified bodies were left to decay on the cross for weeks, and crows would come to feed on the corpses; this can be seen as post-mortem public humiliation. See also gibbeting.
 The punishment of public humiliation has taken many forms, ranging from an offender being forced to relate his crime, to a 'shame flute' (for untalented musicians), to the wearing of conspicuous clothing or jewelry (such as an oversized rosary ("stones of shame") for someone late to church). The offender could alternatively be sentenced to remain exposed in a specific exposed place, in a restraining device such as a yoke or public stocks.
 In the more extreme cases, being subjected to verbal and physical abuse from the crowd could have serious consequences, especially when the hands were bound, preventing self-protection. Some sentences actually prescribed additional humiliation, such as shaving, or would combine it with painful corporal punishments, see below.
 In Colonial America, common forms of public humiliation were the stocks and pillory, imported from Europe. Nearly every sizable town had such instruments of public humiliation, usually at the town square. In pre-World War II Japan, adulterers were publicly exposed purely to shame them.
 In Liberia, boy soldiers stripped civilian women to humiliate them; this was described with the verb phrase "to naked someone else."
 In Siam, an adulteress was paraded with a hibiscus behind the ear. Thieves were tattooed on their faces. Other criminals were paraded with a device made of woven cane on the forehead, or lengths of bamboo hung around the neck. Errant Brahmans had to wear a string of oversize beads.
 Send under the yoke was used in ancient Italy.
 Some have considered sex offender registries in the United States to be a form of public humiliation as judicial punishment. A convicted sex offender's placement on the sex offender registry is public via a state run website in all 50 states. In 2018, a judge in the United States District Court for the District of Colorado declared Colorado's sex offender scheme as unconstitutional, citing cruel and unusual punishment. In 2020, the United States Court of Appeals for the Tenth Circuit overturned that decision.

See also

References

Further reading
 So You've Been Publicly Shamed, a 2015 book by Jon Ronson on the modern phenomenon of online public shaming on Twitter, Tumblr, and elsewhere on social media.

External links 
 

Corporal punishments
Humiliation
Punishments
Torture